Monoplex gemmatus, common name : jeweled triton or beaded triton,  is a species of predatory sea snail, a marine gastropod mollusk in the family Cymatiidae.

Description
The shell size varies between 20 mm and 35 mm

Distribution
This species is distributed in the Indian Ocean along Mauritius, Mozambique, Tanzania and in the Western Pacific Ocean.

References

 Spry, J.F. (1961). The sea shells of Dar es Salaam: Gastropods. Tanganyika Notes and Records 56

External links
 

Cymatiidae
Gastropods described in 1844